Saturday Night Live Korea (abbreviated as SNL Korea or simply as SNLK) is a South Korean late-night live television sketch comedy and variety show. It is adapted from the long-running American TV show Saturday Night Live by NBC, and the show's executive producers are Lorne Michaels and Jennifer Danielson from SNL Studios and Broadway Video, which licenses the format. Originally broadcast by generalist cable network tvN, the weekly program ran from 3 December 2011 to 18 November 2017, and aired on Saturdays at 22:50 KST. In 2021, the format was revived by Coupang Play, and the show premiered on the streaming platform on September 4, 2021, at 22:00 KST.

History

Season one
Written and directed by filmmaker and playwright Jang Jin, the show was officially announced on November 24, 2011, at a roundtable press conference in Cheongdam-dong. The original cast was composed of 17 members: Jang Jin, Ahn Young-mi, Lee Han-wi, Jung Woong-in, Kim Bin-woo, Jang Young-nam, Kim Won-hae, Lee Hae-young, Lee Chul-min, Lee Sang-hoon, Park Joon-seo, Kim Ji-young, Kim Ji-kyung, Min Seo-hyun, Han Seo-jin, Go Kyung-pyo, and Kim Seul-gi. The premiere episode on December 3, 2011, was hosted by actor Kim Joo-hyuk.

Then-showrunner and head writer Jang Jin spoke about the difficulties in recruiting guests, saying "When you’re offering a film, you give them a script, ask them how it is and if they say no, say that's good and turn around, but to get people to appear in this show, I had to beg. I even asked them to appear on the show by giving them my next movie script." The first season ran from December 3, 2011, to January 21, 2012, for eight episodes.

Season two
The second season ran from May 26 to July 14, 2012, for eight episodes. The cast members were Jang Jin, Lee Han-wi, Kim Won-hae, Kang Sung-jin, Jang Young-nam, Jung Sung-ho, Kim Min-kyo, Lee Sang-hoon, Jung Myung-ok, Kang Yu-mi, Im Hye-young, Park Sang-woo, Ahn Young-mi, Kwon Hyeok-su, Go Kyung-pyo, and Kim Seul-gi.

Season three
The third season ran from September 8 to November 15, 2012, for seventeen episodes. The cast members were Jang Jin, Shin Dong-yup, Kim Won-hae, Jung Sung-ho, Park Sang-woo, Kim Min-kyo, Jung Myung-ok, Lee Sang-hoon, Oh Cho-hee, Jang Yoon-seo, Son Bo-min, Seo Yu-ri, Han Seo-jin, Kwon Hyeok-su, Go Kyung-pyo, and Kim Seul-gi.

Season four
The fourth season ran from February 2 to November 23, 2013, for 38 episodes.

Jay Park and Park Eun-ji joined as regular cast members (they had both previously hosted in season 3). Meanwhile, Jang Jin, Go Kyung-pyo, and Oh Cho-hee exited the program. The season 4 cast members were Shin Dong-yup, Kim Won-hae, Lee Sang-hoon, Ahn Young-mi, Kim Min-kyo, Kim Seul-gi, Jung Sung-ho, Jung Myung-ok, Kwon Hyeok-su, Park Sang-woo, Seo Yu-ri, Lee Byung-jin, Jin Won, Jay Park, and Park Eun-ji. New cast additions later in the season were Choi Il-gu, Yoo Se-yoon, 2EYES, and Clara. Jin Won exited the show on episode 18, and Kim Seul-gi did the same on episode 24.

Directors Ahn Sang-hee, Baek Seung-ryong, Kim Min, and Yoo Sung-mo are described them as "SNL Korea's F4."

Season five
The fifth season ran on March 1, 2014, to November 29, 2014, for 35 episodes.

Narsha and Seo Eun-kwang (BtoB) joined as regular cast members, while Clara exited the program. Weekend Update was discontinued, and replaced by a mini-talk show hosted by You Hee-yeol.

Season six
The sixth season started on February 14, 2015, and stopped on June 20, 2015, for a temporary hiatus for the airing of The Genius: Grand Final. It  resumed on September 19, 2015, and ran until December 19, 2015.

2021 revival
On February 17, 2021, NBCUniversal Formats and Broadway Video Enterprise announced that SNL Korea will have a new season, produced this time by AStory. The series will air on Coupang Play later in the same year.

Cast members

Final roster

Musical theme of the opening and closing, and between segments, are performed by the band  (커먼그라운드).

Former members

Cast timeline

Format and segments
The Korean version follows a similar format as the American version, with a host, cast members and several skits for each episode. 
 Weekend Update: News sketch that reviews the week's social, economic, and cultural issues. Anchored by Jang Jin in Seasons 1–3. 
 Wise Search for Life (슬기로운 탐구생활): This pre-recorded sub-segment of Weekend Update satirizes each week's most talked-about headlines and events. Voice narration by Kim Seul-gi.
 Dispatch SNL (출동 SNL): This live-skit is also a sub-segment of WU, and includes interviews by its correspondent .
 SNL Invitation (SNL 초대석): This live-skit, also a sub-segment of WU, involves a person (usually the episode's host, or sometimes a cast member) in a fake or actual situation related to the week's best-known events. 
 SNL Digital Short: Comedic and musical pre-recorded "video shorts" which are performed by SNLK cast members and hosts each week (usually one or two per episode). Their most popular shorts are their Grand Theft Auto parodies, ranging from the Joseon period to modern military.
 Lee Oung-don PD's Eatable X-File: Since the latter episodes of season 3, each week Shin Dong-yup (in the role of Production Director Lee Oung-don [이엉돈 PD]) takes 3 or 4 kinds of food from the hands of other cast members for fun, to judge whether it's suitable to eat or not, then runs away quickly. It is a parody of Channel A's infotainment program .
 Sa-gwa Shilup (사과실업): This is an occasional skit that adopts a business presentation style, for advertising peculiar products. Moderated by Shin Dong-yup, while wearing clothes and make-up similar to Apple co-founder Steve Jobs.

Ratings
The season finale of season two, broadcast on July 14, 2012, was hosted by boy band Super Junior, which was the first non-music program they appeared in as part of the promotion for their sixth studio album Sexy, Free & Single. According to AGB Nielsen Media Research, the episodes achieved a nationwide rating of 1.334%.

Episode 13 of season 3, broadcast on December 1, 2012, and hosted by Jay Park, achieved a nationwide rating of 1.54%, with a peak of 1.85%. It recorded 1.04% ratings in the 20 to 49 age group, as well as 1.96% with a peak of 2.49% for women in their 40s, making it the most-watched program in its time slot for both age groups.

Season 8 controversies
Nearing the conclusion of Season 8 in 2016, an episode that featured the boy band B1A4, SNL Korea released a behind-the-scenes video on their Facebook. The video features an introduction of the band and discussion of their upcoming appearance. As soon as the members are formally introduced, a group of female staff members grope the band members' genitals and run off. The video was taken off of the show's Facebook shortly after along with an apology to the members of B1A4. However, shortly after the incident, boy bands INFINITE and Block B released videos on their twitters under the hashtag "SNL_성추행" ('SNL sexual harassment') stating that this behavior was common on the show. A sexual assault case was filed by petition agency, E-People, against comedian Lee Se-young but the charges were eventually dropped.

SNL Korea was met with heavy criticism after airing a sketch that featured a joke about actress Um Aing-ran's chest. Um had been diagnosed with breast cancer earlier in the year and underwent surgery. Jung Yi-rang, the actress who portrayed Um in the sketch, was unaware of the severity of the condition and issued an apology to Um. 
Season 8 of the SNL Korea ended on December 24, 2016, with singer Hwang Chi-yeul as the last host. tvN issued a statement saying that the show will return for another season but "with a new image".

List of episodes and guests

Awards and nominations

See also
 Gag Concert
 Infinite Challenge
 Korea's Got Talent

References

External links
 SNL Korea official tvN website 
 
 
 

TVN (South Korean TV channel) original programming
South Korean variety television shows
2011 South Korean television series debuts
Korean-language television shows
Korea
South Korean television series based on American television series